Theresa Arnold (born September 20, 1962) is a female boxer who beat a number of name fighters during her career. A native of Boise, Idaho, she still lives in her hometown.

Arnold was important in women's boxing popularity rise in Idaho. Only three of her seventeen bouts were held outside the Northwest United States area, however, a fact that might have prevented her from becoming a larger celebrity. Arnold was one of the figures that helped make the city of Worley a "mecca" of women's boxing.

On November 29, 1995, she beat Carol Stinson by a decision in four rounds in Washington, marking her professional boxing debut. On December 8, she beat Dolores Lira, also by decision, in what marked her debut at her home state. Nineteen days later, she beat the well known Kim Messer, also by decision.

On May 17, 1996, she got her first knockout win, when she stopped Robyn Lopez in three rounds at Caldwell, a small Idaho town. On July 27 of that year, she defeated Suzanne Riccio-Major by an eight round unanimous decision, and then, five days later, she beat Sue Chase, also by decision, but over four rounds instead.

On September 19 of that year, one day before her 34th. birthday, Arnold got what was perhaps the strangest win of her career: fighting outside the Northwest for the first time, she earned a disqualification win when her opponent, Bridgett Riley, lost her contact lenses and was disqualified after five rounds of boxing. Disappointed about the outcome of that fight, Riley retired from boxing for some time, a fact that would later prove vital in a rematch.

A win and a draw (tie) against Katherine Etheridge followed, before Arnold and Riley were rematched. On May 17, 1997, exactly one year after her first knockout win and in her second fight outside the Northwest, she got her second knockout victory when she defeated Riley in their Indio, California rematch, with a sixth round stoppage.

She followed that win with a first round knockout over Kim Young fourteen days later, and another victory over Sue Chase.

On November 12, of that year, she had her first world championship try, when she faced Para Draine for the IBA's world Bantamweight title, in Worley. Arnold became world champion when she outpointed Draine over ten rounds, taking a split decision victory.

On January 10, 1998, Arnold tried to unify her IBA world title with the WIBF's vacant world Bantamweight title, but she suffered her only career loss that night, being knocked out in seven rounds by Eva Jones, in Atlantic City, New Jersey. This was Arnold's only Eastern coast fight.

Arnold had two more wins before deciding to retire, but they were both significant because of different reasons: on April 1, 1998, she achieved another first round knockout, this time over Deanna Wyman, in Worley. And on her last fight, she defeated another well known female boxer, Sonya Emery, on September 23, by an eight round split decision.

Arnold retired with a record of 15 wins, 1 loss and 1 draw, with 4 wins by knockout.

Championships and accomplishments
1997 – IBA Bantamweight title
1996 – NWA Super Bantamweight title

Professional boxing record

See also
 List of female boxers

References

External links
 Theresa Arnold at Awakening Fighters
 
Profile in Sports Pundit

1962 births
Living people
American women boxers
Sportspeople from Boise, Idaho
World boxing champions
Bantamweight boxers
21st-century American women